Jason Kettwig is an American politician who served in the South Dakota House of Representatives from the 4th district from 2017 to 2019.

References

Living people
Republican Party members of the South Dakota House of Representatives
Year of birth missing (living people)